Roosevelt Elementary School is a historic K–8 school located in the Morton neighborhood of Philadelphia, Pennsylvania. It is part of the School District of Philadelphia. The building was designed by Irwin T. Catharine and built in 1922–1924. It is a three-story, 17 bay, brick building on a raised basement in the Colonial Revival-style. It features a central projecting entrance pavilion of brick and stone, with stone pilasters, and a stone cornice and brick parapet. The school was named for President Theodore Roosevelt.

The building was added to the National Register of Historic Places in 1988.

In spring 2013 the school had about 320 students in grades 7 and 8. That year Robert Fulton Elementary School, less than  walking distance, closed, and its students, from the former school zone in the center of Germantown, were moved to Roosevelt. Principal Byron Ryan began his term in fall 2013; at that time the school was understaffed due to layoffs.

References

External links

School buildings on the National Register of Historic Places in Philadelphia
Colonial Revival architecture in Pennsylvania
School buildings completed in 1924
Northwest Philadelphia
School District of Philadelphia
Public elementary schools in Philadelphia
Public middle schools in Pennsylvania
1924 establishments in Pennsylvania